Afromosia barkemeyeri is a species of robber fly (family Asilidae), the sole member of the genus Afromosia. The specific epithet honours Dr Werner Barkemeyer.

References

Asilidae
Insects described in 2015